Khoren Babkeni Abrahamyan (April 1, 1930, Yerevan – December 10, 2004) was an Armenian actor and director, and People's Artist of the USSR. Abrahamyan was honored with the title People’s Artist of the USSR in 1980.

Life and career
He studied at the Yerevan Institute of Theater and Fine Arts and graduated in 1951. Since 1951 worked at Sundukyan State Academic Theatre of Yerevan as actor. In 1980, he was appointed its executive director. As a student, Abramyan played several small parts in movies, including Hamo Bek-Nazaryan’s kolkhoz musical The Girl from Ararat Valley (1949), as well as in Russian productions such as Aleksandr Rou’s children’s film The Secret of the Mountain Lake (1954), Mikhail Kalatozov’s drama about the cultivation of untilled soil in the steppes of Kazakhstan The First Echelon (1956), and Aleksandr Zarkhi’s industrial construction tale The Height (1957). More significant roles included Arsen in The Song of First Love (1958) and Armen in Grigory Melik-Avakyan’s psychological drama The Heart of a Mother (1958). Abrahamyan gained recognition with his performance as Gevork in the Civil War drama The Brothers Saroyan (1968), which he also co-directed, and as the shepherd Pavle in Henrik Malyan’s We and Our Mountains (1970) from Hrant Matevosyan’s well-known novel. He played the lead, the compassionate archivist Armen Abramyan, in Frunze Dovlatyan’s A Chronicle of Yerevan Days (1974). An in demand actor of Armenian cinema in the 1970s, Abramyan also portrayed historical characters, among them the Bolshevik administrator Aleksandr Miasnikyan in Dovlatyan’s The Birth (1978) and Ter-Avetis in Edmond Keosayan’s 18th-century epic The Star of Hope (1979). He also played Sisakyan in the drama about terminal illness Live Long (1980). Abramyan’s filmography consisted of roles in adventure pictures as well as contemporary social drama, comedy, and thrillers.

Some other movies by Abrahamyan are Lord as Rostom, We and Our Mountains as Pavle, The Chronicle of Yerevan Days, Travail as Myasnikyan and Hope Star as The Avedis.

Khoren Abrahamyan is buried at Komitas Pantheon which is located in the city center of Yerevan.

References

External links

1930 births
2004 deaths
Male actors from Yerevan
Soviet male actors
Armenian male film actors
Armenian male stage actors
People's Artists of the USSR
People's Artists of Armenia
20th-century Armenian male actors
Burials at the Komitas Pantheon